River Blyth is the name of several rivers in England.

River Blyth, Northumberland
River Blyth, Suffolk

See also
River Blythe, Warwickshire, England
River Blithe, Staffordshire, England
Blyth River (Northern Territory), Australia